Brian Parkinson is an English retired professional footballer who played as a goalkeeper, spending five seasons in the American Soccer League.

Parkinson began his career with Everton, where he earned the backup goalkeeper job for a brief spell at the age of 18. In 1976, he moved to the Los Angeles Skyhawks where he had the lowest goals against average (0.78) among American Soccer League goalkeepers for the league champions. His exploits led to him being nicknamed "Superstop." He followed that in 1977 when he had the second lowest goals against average among ASL keepers. In 1980, he spent one season with the Miami Americans.

References

American Soccer League (1933–1983) players
English footballers
English expatriate footballers
Los Angeles Skyhawks players
Miami Americans players
1951 births
Living people
Everton F.C. players
Association football goalkeepers
English expatriate sportspeople in the United States
Expatriate soccer players in the United States
Footballers from Liverpool
California Sunshine players